Gymnopilus pachycystis is a species of mushroom-forming fungus in the family Hymenogastraceae. It is found in Central America.

See also

List of Gymnopilus species

References

pachycystis
Fungi of Central America
Fungi described in 1989
Taxa named by Rolf Singer